Comanche Nation Casino, often known as Comanche Nation Entertainment, is a Native American casino geographically situated in the Southwest Great Plains Country of the United States. The American Indian casino is located in Lawton, Comanche County, Oklahoma with East Cache Creek serving as a picturesque. The gaming establishment, which opened in 2007, is operated and owned by the tribal sovereignty of the Comanche Nation of Oklahoma with the governing powers in Lawton.

Comanche Nation Gaming Venues
 Comanche Red River Casino
 Comanche Spur Casino 
 Comanche Star Casino

See also
American Gaming Association
History of gambling in the United States
Indian Gaming Regulatory Act
National Indian Gaming Commission

References

Further reading

External links
 
 
 
 
 

Casinos in Oklahoma
Lawton, Oklahoma
Buildings and structures in Comanche County, Oklahoma
Tourist attractions in Comanche County, Oklahoma
Casinos completed in 2007
2007 establishments in Oklahoma
Native American casinos
Native American history of Oklahoma